Allumette Lake is a lake in Ontario, Canada.  It is an enlargement of the Ottawa River, near Pembroke.

See also
List of lakes in Ontario

References
 National Resources Canada

Lakes of Renfrew County